Avery County is a county located in the U.S. state of North Carolina. As of the 2020 census, the population was 17,806. The county seat is Newland. The county seat was initially established in Elk Park when the county was first formed, but was moved to Newland upon completion of the courthouse in 1912. Founded in 1911, it is the youngest of North Carolina's 100 counties.

History
The county is the newest of North Carolina's 100 counties. It was formed in 1911 from parts of Caldwell County, Mitchell County, and Watauga County. It was named for Waightstill Avery, a colonel in the American Revolutionary War and the first Attorney General of North Carolina (1777-1779). It is often noted for the large amount of Christmas trees that the county produces. The county seat was originally in the Town of Elk Park, which was then the largest town in the county, located on the county's north end, on the Tennessee line. Upon completion of the county's courthouse in 1912, the seat was moved to the central location of what was then an unincorporated area known as Fields of Toe, for the meadows along the head of the Toe River, in what is now the incorporated Town of Newland. The town was so named for then Lt. Gov. William Newland, an influential Democrat, who helped garner support in the then heavily Democratic legislature in Raleigh, for Avery County, an overwhelmingly pro-Union Republican area, becoming the state's 100th and final county.

According to local legend, Elk Park citizens were upset at the decision to move of the county seat from their town, and they refused to give up the books. The then sheriff, like all county officials, was a Democrat and an interim appointee of the Democratic governor in Raleigh, who would  hold office from July 1, 1911, until the next election cycle in late 1912, when the almost all-Republican electorate would undoubtedly vote in all Republicans as local officials. The sheriff was leery of confronting the irate local Elk Park citizens, so his wife baked cookies and had their pastor deliver them as a peace offering. The citizens then cheerfully handed over the books, which were sent to the new offices at the new courthouse in Newland

Geography

Avery County is extremely rural and mountainous with all of the county's terrain located within the Appalachian Mountains range; with a mean altitude of  it is the second-highest county east of the Mississippi behind nearby Haywood County. Most of Grandfather Mountain, whose highest point is  Calloway Peak on the tri-point bordering Watauga and Caldwell Counties, is within Avery County. At , Beech Mountain (also shared with Watauga County) is the highest incorporated community east of the Mississippi River, while at  Newland is the highest county seat in the Eastern United States.

National protected areas
 Blue Ridge Parkway (part)
 Pisgah National Forest (part)

State and local protected areas 
 Bear Paw State Natural Area
 Gill State Forest (part)
 Grandfather Mountain State Park (part)
 Pineola Bog State Natural Area
 Sugar Mountain Bog State Natural Area
 Yellow Mountain State Natural Area (part)

Major water bodies 
 Buckeye Creek
 Cranberry Creek
 Little Horse Creek
 Linville River
 Mill Creek
 North Harper Creek
 North Toe River
 Watauga River

Adjacent counties
 Johnson County, Tennessee - north
 Watauga County - northeast
 Caldwell County - east
 Burke County - south
 McDowell County - south
 Mitchell County - west
 Carter County, Tennessee - northwest

Transportation

Major highways

Aviation
Avery County Airport (7A8) is a small, public general aviation facility with no control tower. It primarily serves private aircraft and has no regularly scheduled commercial or cargo flights or major carriers. The facility jointly serves Avery and Mitchell Counties and is located on Grassy Creek Road, just off US19E near the Mitchell County Line in Green valley, 10 miles south of Newland and 4 miles east of Spruce Pine. It is jointly operated by both counties and has a 3000-foot-long runway that is 60 feet wide, with over runs at both ends in excess of 110 feet. The facility has private contractors who offer private air services, flying lessons and charter flights. The airport has seen increased usage in recent years and has been upgraded several times. The county has made cursory inquiries into resurfacing the airport to a heavier weight rating, to allow NC Air National Guard C-130 aircraft from Charlotte Douglass International Airport Air National Guard Base to conduct intermittent landing and "touch and go" combat exercises. The US Marine Corps on the NC coast at New River and Cherry Point Air Stations has also expressed an interest in conducting mountain landing training for Osprey vertical takeoff aircraft if the airport runway is thickened, as has the NC Army National Guard for its helicopters located in Salisbury. The Avery County runway is of sufficient length to accommodate large military aircraft, but not of sufficient surface thickness. Mission Hospital in Asheville has also been approached to possibly establish an air ambulance base at the airport.

A smaller private airport is also located in Banner Elk parallel to NC 194 at the Elk River Club resort; which is for residents and approved guests of the Elk River Property Owners Association.
Avery County Transportation (ACT) provides general public transportation vans for a fee.  The service is by call, offering rides to various locations in the county and out-of-county medical rides. The transportation office and garage is located on NC 194, just north of the Newland city limits.

Major Infrastructure 
 Avery County/Morrison Airport 
 Linville Ridge Heliport

Demographics

2020 census

As of the 2020 United States census, there were 17,806 people, 6,551 households, and 4,319 families residing in the county.

2000 census
As of the census of 2000, there were 17,167 people, 6,532 households, and 4,546 families residing in the county.  The population density was 70 people per square mile (27/km2).  There were 11,911 housing units at an average density of 48 per square mile (19/km2).  The racial makeup of the county was 93.95% White, 3.48% Black or African American, 0.34% Native American, 0.19% Asian, 0.04% Pacific Islander, 1.28% from other races, and 0.71% from two or more races.  2.41% of the population were Hispanic or Latino of any race.

There were 6,532 households, out of which 27.10% had children under the age of 18 living with them, 57.10% were married couples living together, 9.10% had a female householder with no husband present, and 30.40% were non-families. 26.60% of all households were made up of individuals, and 11.00% had someone living alone who was 65 years of age or older.  The average household size was 2.34 and the average family size was 2.82.

In the county, the population was spread out, with 19.40% under the age of 18, 10.30% from 18 to 24, 30.10% from 25 to 44, 24.40% from 45 to 64, and 15.70% who were 65 years of age or older.  The median age of Avery County is aging, with it at 38 years. For every 100 females there were 111.80 males.  For every 100 females age 18 and over, there were 112.90 males.

The median income for a household in the county was $30,627, and the median income for a family was $37,454. Males had a median income of $25,983 versus $21,652 for females. The per capita income for the county was $15,176.  About 10.90% of families and 15.30% of the population were below the poverty line, including 19.30% of those under age 18 and 19.00% of those age 65 or over.

Law and government
The county is governed by a five-member Board of County Commissioners who are elected to two or four-year terms, depending on the number and percentage of votes they receive when elected. The current members are Martha Hicks, a retired banker; Wood Hall Young Jr, a retired employee of Avery County Schools; Tim Phillips, a retired employee of Mountain Electric; Blake Vance, a financial planning and insurance specialist and Dennis Aldridge.

Avery County is a member of the regional High Country Council of Governments. The county commissioners appoint a county manager to oversee day-to-day operations of county government of all departments that are not controlled by an elected head. The current county manager position is filled by Phillip Barrier, the county's previous Tax Assessor-Collector. Finance officer is currently vacant. The board of commissioners also appoints qualified citizen applicants to various boards and committees, such as business and economic development, social service board, library board, Mayland Community College Board and others (source: Avery County government website).

Pursuant to state law, some of the most important officials in the county are elected. These include the offices of Sheriff (Michael P. Henley), Register of Deeds (currently Renee Dellinger), Clerk of Superior Court (currently Theresa Benfield), and Coroner (currently John A. Millan). Elected district judicial officials include: District Attorney Seth Banks of Yancey County, who like the district judges, covers the entire 24th Judicial District of Avery, Watauga, Mitchell, Yancey and Madison Counties. Resident Superior Court Judges are former assistant district attorney Gary Gavennus and former Chief District Court Judge Greg Horne of Boone, who is also a former assistant district attorney. Both superior court judges work out of Boone. The Chief District Court Judge is former chief assistant district attorney Ted Mcintyre of Spruce Pine, who replaced long-serving Chief Judge Alexander Banner Lyerly, who retired in 2013. Mcintyre's office is in Newland. Other district court judges are: former Superior Court Judge Hal Harrison of Spruce Pine, Rebecca Eggers-Gryder of Boone and Matt Rupp of Boone, who replaced retired Judge Larry Leake of Madison County, who was appointed by Governor Roy Cooper to fill the unexpired term of Warren Hughes, who retired in January 2017, but remains available as an emergency judge. The Chief Magistrate is attorney Bruce Lacey, with retired Banner Elk police chief Bill Burleson and Newland businessman Tim Bounds all serving as Magistrates. Barbara Jones is Social Services Director and the Tax Collector-Assessor position is vacant. Building inspector is former NBA star Tommy Burleson and the County Board of Elections is headed by Sheila Ollis. The county's elected Soil and Water Board District Supervisors are Bill Beutell and Ann Coleman (source: Avery County government website; NC State Board of Elections).

The county also has a non-partisan elected school board to oversee the countywide school district.  The current school board chairman is John Greene, with retired teacher Kathy Aldridge serving as vice chair.  Other school board members are retired Avery High School Principal Patricia Edwards. The county's superintendent of schools is Dr. Dan Brigman. The School Board is located on NC 194 near the Newland city limits. It also houses the school bus garage, support staff and other school system administrative offices.

Government buildings
Overlooking Avery Square is the historic 1912 Avery County Courthouse. The square, includes monuments to fallen peace officers, fallen firefighters and as of 2016, a large veteran's memorial. The courthouse was remodeled in 1996 and again in 2014, to add more office space and a second smaller courtroom. The courthouse is located on Shultz Circle and Glenn Hicks Lane, which was renamed from Jail Street, in honor of Avery Sheriff's Deputy Lt. Glenn H. Hicks, who was murdered in the line of duty in 2003.

The courthouse also houses local office of the North Carolina Probation and Parole Division, judges offices and chambers, district attorney's sub-office, the county map office, tax office, inspection office, register of deeds, clerk of superior court, guardian ad litem and North Carolina juvenile justice department. Connected to the courthouse is the sheriff's office and the county jail, an elections office, county 911 emergency dispatch center and magistrate's courtroom.

The county administrative building provides work space for the county manager and many other county offices such as social services, payroll, finance, veterans services, fire marshal, emergency management, waste management, technology and personnel. In 1997, a second courtroom and a small magistrate's courtroom at the courthouse was created.

The Avery County Sheriff's Office provides law enforcement protection to the entire county. The county has no police department. The Sheriff also provides security to the courts and courthouse, serves civil orders of the courts and operates the jail complex.

Other county services includes a 911 emergency dispatch center that provides service to all county law enforcement (Sheriff's office, 6 town police departments and three company police agencies, plus communications support to the NC Highway Patrol Troopers, NC Wildlife officers, state alcohol agents and state park rangers assigned locally), fire, EMS and rescue services in the county. The county building also houses county fire marshal and emergency management offices, a veteran's services office and an office of economic development, along with staffed trash collection sites throughout the county and a landfill.

Politics
Owing to its Appalachian highland location, rural character, and powerful Unionist sympathies from the Civil War (1861–1865), Avery County has continually voted overwhelmingly Republican in Presidential elections, even during the Solid South Democratic era. Since the county's formation in 1911, no Democratic presidential candidate has obtained forty percent of the county's vote, and only Lyndon Johnson in 1964 and Jimmy Carter in 1976 have received so much as thirty percent. An illustration of Avery County's rock-ribbed Republicanism can be seen in 1936 when Alf Landon won the county by 55.96 percentage points, making it Landon's fifth-strongest county in the nation despite Landon losing North Carolina to Franklin Roosevelt by 46.80 percent.

Avery County is part of the 47th NC Senate District in the North Carolina State Senate. The senate seat is held by Republican Warren Daniel, a Morganton attorney and former Army officer. The county is part of the 85th NC House District in the North Carolina House of Representatives. Currently representing the 85th is Josh Dobson, a 1999 graduate of Avery County High School and a resident of neighboring McDowell County, where he previously served as a county commissioner. Dobson opted not to seek re-election to run for State Labor Commissioner.

Economy
The county contains local attractions such as Grandfather Mountain, Grandfather Mountain State Park, Linville Gorge Wilderness, Linville Falls, Pisgah National Forest and the Blue Ridge Parkway, which all attract large numbers of visitors. In October, the annual "Wooly Worm" festival at the old school in downtown Banner Elk draws world visitors who come to see caterpillar races that locals happily claim can predict the severity of coming winters based on the fur coats of the worms. The Grandfather Mountain Highland Games is held each year the first full weekend after July 4 and is one of the largest Scottish gatherings outside Scotland and features bagpipes, bands, Scottish food, music, authentic clothing and games such as log and caber toss and use of dogs in sheep herding. Also in October is Oz Days at the former Land of Oz theme park on Beech Mountain in the fall also attracts visitors who love the legacy of the famous Judy Garland movie "The Wizard of Oz" based on Frank Baum's famous book. Oktoberfest on Sugar Mountain and Beech Mountain also in October draw large crowds and the annual Music Festival in Newland on July 4 also attracts many visitors.

Ski Resorts are  immensely popular tourist destinations in the cold winter months when snowfall and man-made snow create ideal skiing conditions.  Sugar Mountain Ski Resort, located in Sugar Mountain, and Ski Beech Resort, located in Beech Mountain, provide multiple winter actives including skiing, snowboarding, snow tubing and ice skating.  Hawks Nest Tubing Resort, located in Seven Devils offers snow tubing.

Second homes, gated communities, condominiums, rental properties, hotel-motel lodging, bed and breakfasts, campgrounds and real estate in general all are critically important sources of jobs, income and tax revenue. The brilliant fall colors or the foliage of the surrounding mountains, winter sports, mountain bicycling, hiking, horseback riding, warm weather camping, hiking, wildlife viewing, hunting and searching for geological finds all make for a year-round tourism-generated and regular real estate market.

Major Employers: The State of North Carolina is the largest employer in the county. It operates a forestry center, DOT office, State Highway Patrol office, state agriculture extension office, probation/parole office, alcohol law enforcement office, a state park service office and two prisons in lower Avery County on the Mitchell County border. Those side-by-side facilities are Mountain View and Avery-Mitchell. A third prison facility, the BRIDGE Unit, was a novel project to use non-violent, first-time youthful felony offenders to work on state lands and fight forest fires as "smoke jumpers." It was closed in the late 1990s and torn down. Other major employers are: the Avery County School System, Mayland Community College, Cannon Memorial Hospital, Lees-McRae College, Avery County government, Lowes Foods, Unimin, various large tree farms and mining operations which are also important local employers.

The Avery Fairgrounds is located on Vale Road, just outside the Newland city limits. It is funded both by allocated county funds and private funding and controlled by a fair board. The Avery County Agricultural and Horticultural Fair has been an annual event in early September of each year and draws huge crowds to the site for rides, displays and other events.

Avery County is one of 420 counties and eight independent cities that fall into the Appalachian Region as defined by the US Government's Appalachian Regional Council (ARC). ARC was founded by President Lyndon B. Johnson in 1965 to address poverty in the 13 Eastern states of Appalachia. Avery is listed as "Transitional" by the ARC. Based on 2006 statistics from the US Government, the five classification categories for factors such as unemployment, income and poverty rate, the levels are: Distressed (worst), At-risk, Transitional, Competitive and Attainment. According to the Bureau of Labor Statistics, the unemployment rate as of August 2013 was 10.6% (not seasonally adjusted), down from 11.2% for 2012.  According to Census American Community Survey data for 2011 the poverty rate is listed at 18.1%.

Agriculture
The county's agricultural focus is the mass production of Fraser Fir Christmas Trees. Tree farms produce trees year round and they are harvested in mid October, wrapped, stacked and sold in bulk at local or far away lots or shipped to wholesalers across the country. Some farms also sell directly to visitors. Shrubbery, landscaping and greenhouses all are important agricultural aspects of the county's economy, as is beef cattle farming.

In keeping with a growing trend in the NC mountains and foothills, grape growing and vineyards are becoming popular with three vineyards presently operating in the county in Banner Elk, Plumtree and Linville Falls.

Education

Avery County schools
Avery County Schools has eight schools housed on seven campuses, ranging from pre-kindergarten to twelfth grade: five elementary schools, two middle schools and a central high school. Avery High School has close to 700 students and is located near Newland. It is scheduled for large-scale renovations by 2023. Avery High has a dual enrolment partnership program with Mayland Community College, which allows students to earn college credits while still in high school. The two county middle schools are: Avery Middle across from the High School built in 1978 and Cranberry Middle in Cranberry on a joint campus with Freedom Trail elementary near Elk Park was built in 1998. Other county elementary schools are located in: Newland, Crossnore Elementary was built on a new campus in 2003, Riverside Elementary in lower western Avery built in 1987 and Banner Elk Elementary.

Three small local high schools were closed in 1969 with the opening of the present central Avery County High School near Newland. Crossnore High School was torn down in the early 1970s. The largest of the old high schools, Cranberry High School, is now preserved as a community center in Cranberry near Elk Park. Numerous older historic rock work schools built by the Depression-era Work Projects Administration (WPA) that had been community K-8 schools were closed, starting with the old Riverside School in 1987. Both Elk Park School and Minneapolis Schools were closed in 1998 and consolidated into the new Cranberry Middle-Freedom trail School. Beech Mountain school was the last K-8 school in Avery County. It was closed in 2008 and is now a community center. The area students were moved to Cranberry Middle-Freedom Trail School.  The last WPA school still operating in the county was the old downtown Banner Elk School, which closed in 2011 and reopened on a new campus located between Banner Elk and Sugar Mountain.

Charter schools
Two authorized charter schools operate in Avery County:
 Crossnore Academy, formerly an orphanage in the Town of Crossnore
 Grandfather Academy, formerly Grandfather Home Orphanage in Banner Elk

Colleges and universities
 Lees-McRae College (LMC), located in Banner Elk, is a private, four-year liberal arts college that is Presbyterian Church affiliated.
 Mayland Community College (MCC), located straddling along the county line of both Avery and Mitchell Counties, is a public community college, which offers associate's degrees and a university-parallel college transfer program towards a bachelor's degree.

Media
Based in Newland, the Avery Post and Avery Journal-Times cover all of Avery County. The Avery Journal-Times newspaper is owned by Jones Media publishing company and is a sister publication of the Watauga Democrat in Boone, while the Post is locally owned 

WECR radio station at 1130 on the AM dial serves the local area with local programs and religious music, along with local news, events and weather.

Television coverage is primarily based out of Charlotte, which the county is in its Designated Market Area (DMA).  However, because of proximity, several stations in the Tri-Cities also cover the area and are carried on local cable.

Medical
The county's public hospital is Charles A. Cannon Memorial Hospital in Linville, a campus of Appalachian Healthcare System, headquartered at Watauga Medical Center in Boone. The hospital is centrally located in Linville and opened in 2000, to consolidate and replace the old Cannon Hospital located in Banner Elk and Sloop Hospital located in Crossnore. The new campus also hosts the Sloop Medical Building, which houses various doctor's and dentist's offices, the local YMCA complex, and a pharmacy. The hospital is a critical care facility with a 24-hour emergency department as well as imagery, lab, surgery, and other services. It has 25 medical beds. Critical illnesses and injuries and trauma patients are often stabilized at Cannon, then are flown or transported by ambulance to hospitals in Charlotte, Asheville, or Johnson City, Tennessee.

Blue Ridge Hospital, a Mission Health care System campus, located just beyond Avery County in the neighboring Mitchell County town of Spruce Pine, also serves the lower portion of Avery County.

The Avery County Emergency Medical Service (EMS) is a full-time county department (since 1994). They provide paramedic-level emergency medical care via three ambulances and a supervisor's SUV at all times, at station locations across the county. Backup is provided by fire departments, a rescue squad and law enforcement first responders.

Communities

Towns
 Banner Elk (largest town)
 Beech Mountain
 Crossnore
 Elk Park
 Newland (county seat)
 Seven Devils

Villages
 Grandfather
 Sugar Mountain

Townships

 Altamont
 Banner Elk
 Beech Mountain
 Carey's Flat
 Cranberry
 Elk Park
 Frank
 Heaton
 Hughes
 Ingalls
 Linville
 Minneapolis
 Montezuma
 Newland No. 1
 Newland No. 2
 Pineola
 Plumtree
 Pyatte
 Roaring Creek

Unincorporated communities

 Altamont
 Cranberry
 Frank
 Gragg
 Heaton
 Ingalls
 Linville
 Linville Falls
 Minneapolis
 Montezuma
 Pineola
 Plumtree
 Roaring Creek
 Three Mile
 Vale

See also
 List of counties in North Carolina
 National Register of Historic Places listings in Avery County, North Carolina
 List of North Carolina State Parks
 List of North Carolina state forests
 National Park Service
 List of national forests of the United States

References

Further reading
 Cooper, Horton. History of Avery County,  Biltmore Press, 1964
 Cooper, Horton. North Carolina Mountain Folklore and Miscellany Murfreesboro, N.C., Johnson Pub. Co., c1972
 Hardy, Michael C. Avery County: Images of America, Charleston, SC: Arcadia Publishing, 2005
 Hardy, Michael C. Remembering Avery County, Charleston, SC: The History Press, 2007

External links

 
 
 Cy Crumley ET&WNC Photo Collection

 
1911 establishments in North Carolina
Populated places established in 1911
Western North Carolina
Counties of Appalachia